Hankook Tire & Technology (also known simply as Hankook), is a South Korean tire company. Based in Seoul, Hankook is the seventh largest tire company in the world.

History
Hankook Tire was established by Jae Hun Chung's grandfather in 1941 as the Chosun Tire Company and was renamed to Hankook Tire Manufacturing in 1968. The word "Hankook" literally means Korea, thus Korea Tire Company.

The company now supplies tires as original equipment to various automakers. In addition to producing about 102 million tires annually, the company also sells batteries, alloy wheels, and brake pads.

In 2011, Hankook Tire Co. announced that the company will invest $1.1 billion to build a factory in West Java, Indonesia as part of a plan to become the 5th largest tire manufacturer in the world. On June 9, 2011 a ground breaking ceremony was held at a 60-hectare area as a regional hub production for export to Asian, North America and Middle East countries.

In October 2013, the company announced plans to open a new factory in Clarksville, Tennessee which was later opened in October 2017.

Facts and figures 
According to Modern Tire Dealer, Hankook's new tire sales for 2007 were $3.5 billion, a 20.7% year-over-year increase from 2006 ($2.9 billion).

Global offices
The company has its headquarters in South Korea and has manufacturing facilities in South Korea, the People's Republic of China, Hungary, Indonesia, and the United States. It has technical centers in Daejon, Korea; Akron, Ohio; Hannover, Germany; Osaka, Japan; and China.

In April 2016, the company announced it would move its North American headquarters from Wayne, New Jersey, to Nashville, Tennessee. This move is reported to create up to 200 jobs in Davidson County and the company would be investing $5 million in the process.

Motorsports involvement

Hankook entered motorsports in Europe, North America, and in Asia. They signed with FBR (Farnbarcher Racing) to race a Ferrari F430 GT with Hankook Tires in the 2009 Le Mans Series season. The company supplied tires for the Primetime Race Group that raced in the GT2 class of the American Le Mans Series in 2008. It supplied tires from 2007–2009 for IMSA Prototype Lites, a support series for the American Le Mans Series. Since 2009, the Hankook Team Farnbacher has competed in the GT class of the Le Mans Series. It also supplies tires for the Hankook KTR team that races in the Super GT and the Asian Le Mans Series and for the Formula 3 Euroseries.

In rallying, Hankook are the series sponsors of the Scottish Rally Championship. Its tires have been used at the European-based Intercontinental Rally Challenge as well.

Since 2011, Hankook is the official tyre partner for the Deutsche Tourenwagen Masters, one of the world's most popular touring car series.

Hankook sponsored Formula Drift driver Chris Forsberg, a three-time champion (with his most recent championship coming as recent as the 2016 season), until 2018 season.

Hankook replaces Michelin as the official tire supplier for Formula E for its third-generation car starting from the 2022-23 season.

Sponsorships
Hankook sponsors Real Madrid, Bundesliga club Borussia Dortmund, and Ligue 1 club AS Monaco FC.

Hankook was once the major sponsor of the Melbourne Football Club in the Australian Football League.

Hankook sponsors the English rugby union team Northampton Saints.

Hankook sponsors the New Zealand Super Rugby team the Crusaders

Hankook is one of the sponsors of the UEFA Europa League since 2012. In 2021, Hankook's partnership with UEFA was renewed and will include sponsoring the new UEFA Europa Conference League through the Laufenn brand.

Hankook is also involved in drifting sponsorship in a number of countries, most notably in North America in the Formula D championship and in Ireland in the Prodrift championship.

Hankook is the official tire supplier of the reality TV series Car Warriors.

As of 2017, Hankook is one of the major sponsors of the Kontinental Hockey League.

Hankook is also involved with simracing, as the main sponsor for Liga ZGT and ApexGT e-Sports, brazilians Gran Turismo Sport Simracing League.

Since 2018, Hankook has been the official tire of Major League Baseball and sponsored the 2020 MLB Wild Card Series.

Since 2019, Hankook is the main sponsor of SVRT, a Gran Turismo Sport SimRacing Team.

In 2021 Hankook will be sponsoring the 3DBotMaker Diecast Racing League on Youtube.

Awards 
Traditionally, Hankook has applied for international product design competitions. The received awards are widely used in the company's marketing activities, for example, at specialized exhibitions, during training seminars for dealers, in printed catalogs and advertising. Hankook received most of the awards from the German-based organizations International Forum Design and Red Dot.

Hankook also earned several awards for its concept tires. The latest ones are the Hexonic smart tire for autonomous car sharing and the futuristic Aeroflow racing tire for motorsport competition. In 2019, both tires won the US-based International Design Excellence Awards (IDEA).

References

External links

Tire manufacturers of South Korea
Chemical companies of South Korea
Auto parts suppliers of South Korea
Automotive companies established in 1941
Companies listed on the Korea Exchange
Chaebol
South Korean brands
Manufacturing companies based in Seoul
Multinational companies headquartered in South Korea
1941 establishments in Korea